The third series of MasterChef New Zealand was broadcast in 2012. Filming started in November 2011. The series started on 21 February 2012. This season the number of contestants changed from 12 to 16, also increasing the number of episode from 12-13 to 16-17. The winner was Chelsea Winter, who beat runner-up Ana Schwarz 77 points to 72.

Contestants

Elimination table

Andy withdrew from the competition at the beginning of Episode 6 due to health concerns.
 This Contestant Won The Competition.
 This Contestant Was The Runner-up.
 This Contestant Won The Elimination Challenge.
 This Contestant Was In the Winning Team.
 This Contestant was in the bottom group.
 This Contestant withdrew from the competition.
 This Contestant was eliminated.

Episodes

References 

Series 3
2012 New Zealand television seasons